Rock Camp may refer to:

Rock Camp, Ohio, an unincorporated community in Lawrence County, Ohio, U.S.
Rock Camp, West Virginia, an unincorporated community in Monroe County, West Virginia, U.S.
Rock Camp (TV series), a 2004 Canadian reality television series
Rock Camp Motocross, a motocross track located in Lawrence County, Ohio, U.S.

See also
Camp Rock (disambiguation)